Francis Xavier "Biff" Poggi (born June 6, 1959) is an American football coach and former player. He is the head football coach at the University of North Carolina at Charlotte. An investment manager, Poggi coached for over twenty years at the Gilman School (1996–2015) and Saint Frances Academy (2017–2020) in Baltimore, and also several years as an off-field analyst for the Michigan Wolverines under head coach Jim Harbaugh.

Head coaching record

College

References

1959 births
Living people
American football offensive linemen
Charlotte 49ers football coaches
Duke University alumni
Michigan Wolverines football coaches
The Citadel Bulldogs football coaches
Pittsburgh Panthers football players
High school football coaches in Maryland
Coaches of American football from Maryland
Players of American football from Baltimore